Tedarrell Anthony "TJ" Slaton Jr. (born October 3, 1997) is an American football defensive end for the Green Bay Packers of the National Football League (NFL). He played college football at Florida, and was selected by the Packers in the fifth round of the 2021 NFL Draft.

Early years
Slaton was born in Fort Lauderdale, Florida. He attended and played football at American Heritage School in nearby Plantation, where one of his coaches was former NFL cornerback Patrick Surtain. His teammates included Surtain's son, Patrick II, and Tyson Campbell.

College career
Slaton played college football at the University of Florida. In four seasons with the Gators, he played in 45 games with 14 starts, recording 98 tackles (34 solo, 10 for loss), 3.5 sacks, nine QB hurries, one pass deflection, and one fumble recovery.

Professional career

On May 1, 2021, Slaton was selected 173rd overall by the Green Bay Packers in the 2021 NFL Draft. He signed his four-year rookie contract on May 14, 2021. He was listed as second on the depth chart to begin the season, behind veteran Kenny Clark.

He saw his first NFL action on September 12, 2021, against the New Orleans Saints, recording two solo tackles in the 38–3 loss. He recorded a half sack in the Packers' Week 3 victory against the San Francisco 49ers, and another half sack two weeks later in a win against the Cincinnati Bengals. He saw extensive action in a Week 9 game against the defending AFC champion Kansas City Chiefs, when he played most of the game in relief of an injured Kenny Clark, where he produced 3 "stops", tackles that were determined to be a failure for the opposing offense.

References

External links
Green Bay Packers bio
Florida Gators bio

1997 births
Living people
American football defensive tackles
Florida Gators football players
Green Bay Packers players
Players of American football from Fort Lauderdale, Florida
American Heritage School (Florida) alumni